Henadz Mardas (12 June 1970 — 2 June 2020) was a Belarusian professional football player and coach.

Honours
Neman Grodno
Belarusian Cup winner: 1992–93

BATE Borisov
Belarusian Premier League champion: 2002

Death
Mardas died on 2 June 2020 from a bowel cancer, which he was initially diagnosed with in 2015.

References

External links
Profile at teams.by

1970 births
2020 deaths
Soviet footballers
Belarusian footballers
Belarusian expatriate footballers
FC Zorya Luhansk players
FC Neman Grodno players
SC Tavriya Simferopol players
FC BATE Borisov players
FC Smorgon players
Ukrainian Premier League players
Place of death missing
Belarusian Premier League players
Expatriate footballers in Ukraine
Belarusian expatriate sportspeople in Ukraine
Association football defenders
Belarusian football managers
FC Smorgon managers
Deaths from colorectal cancer